Antonia Caenis or Cenide, (died 74 AD) a former slave and secretary of Antonia Minor (mother of the emperor Claudius), was Roman emperor Vespasian's contubernalis.

Life
It could be thought that she had family in Istria, now in Croatia, based on a trip she took there (Suet. Dom. 12.3).  In her 30s Caenis, still possibly a slave, was in an unofficial type of relationship with Vespasian, known as contubernium, before his marriage. According to Suetonius, after the death of Vespasian's wife Flavia Domitilla, Vespasian and Caenis, now a freedwoman, resumed their relationship; she was his wife "in all but name" until her death in AD 74.

She had a remarkable memory and considerable influence on the emperor's administration, carried out official business on his behalf, and apparently made a lot of money from her position. However, she was treated with disrespect by Vespasian's son Domitian, who refused to greet her as one of the family.

Popular culture
The life of Caenis and her love-story with Vespasian is portrayed in Lindsey Davis' novel The Course of Honour.
She is also a character who features regularly in Robert Fabbri's Vespasian series, where she is depicted as being the long lost grand-niece of the king of the Caenii, a rebelling tribe in Thracia.
Robert Graves, in his short story "Caenis on Incest," used her as a kind of foil to present what he thought to be the underlying reason for the power-related murders chronicled in I Claudius. The story is included in his compendium "Occupation: Writer," and he admits having missed the real reason for the murders in the introduction to that anthology.

See also
List of slaves
 Claudia Acte
 Galeria Lysistrate
 Marcia (mistress of Commodus)

References

Sources
Suetonius, Lives of the Twelve Caesars: Vespasian 3, 21; Domitian 12.3
Dio Cassius, Roman History 66.14
 William Smith (1870), Dictionary of Greek and Roman Biography and Mythology

74 deaths
1st-century Roman women
Emperor's slaves and freedmen
Year of birth unknown
Vespasian
Mistresses of Roman royalty
Concubines